Chitrakoot Assembly constituency may refer to 
 Chitrakoot, Madhya Pradesh Assembly constituency
 Chitrakoot, Uttar Pradesh Assembly constituency